Savannah station may refer to:

Savannah station (Amtrak), the current train station in Savannah, Georgia
Savannah Union Station, a demolished former train station in Savannah
The former train station at the Central of Georgia Railroad: Savannah Shops and Terminal Facilities